Kerala State Road Transport Corporation (KSRTC) is a state-owned road transport corporation in the Indian state of Kerala. It is one of the country's oldest state-run public bus transport services. The corporation is divided into three zones (South, Central and North), and its headquarters is in the state capital Thiruvananthapuram. The corporation transports an average of 3.145 million commuters per day.

The Kerala Urban Road Transport Corporation (KURTC) was formed under KRTC in 2015 to manage affairs related to urban transportation. It was inaugurated on 12 April 2015 at Thevara. On 9 November 2021, a legally independent company called KSRTC SWIFT was formed to operate the long-distance buses of the Kerala Road Transport Corporation for a period of 10 years with an aim overcome the financial crisis faced by the corporation.

History

Travancore State Transport Department 
The corporation's history dates back to years before the formation of Kerala state, which makes it one of the oldest state-operated public road transport services in India. The Travancore government, headed by King Chithira Thirunal Balarama Varma, decided to establish the Travancore State Transport Department (TSTD) the predecessor of KSRTC, to improve the existing public-transport system.

Initially, the department imported 60 Commer PNF3 chassis from England. Under the supervision of E.G Salter, the then Assistant Operating Superintendent of London Passenger Transport Board, the imported chassis were fitted with Perkins Lynx diesel engines. The bus bodies were built by department staff, and Travancore Dewan C. P. Ramaswami Iyer insisted on using local wood. The body shop (supervised by Salter) was originally in Chakai, and was later moved to Pappanamcode. Salter's experimental body design became standard on the rest of the buses.

Most of the private operators on the Trivandrum-Kanyakumari route had to close when the roads were nationalized, and many experienced drivers, conductors, and inspectors lost their jobs. TSTD recruited them, and Salter selected 60 people out of 81 applicants. Nearly one hundred applicants with bachelor's degrees were employed as inspectors and conductors.

The state road-transport service was inaugurated on 20 February 1938 by Maharaja Sree Chithira Thirunal, who (with his family, Col. Goda Varma Raja, and other dignitaries) rode the first bus on the Main Road to Kowdiar Square; Salter drove the bus. A fleet of 33 buses and a large crowd joined in the celebration. On 21 February 1938, the first bus operated from Trivandrum to Kanyakumari.

The early buses had 23 leather seats. Entry was through the rear, and the buses had a centre aisle. Ten first-class seats were in the front. Schedules, fares and stops were published, and a parcel service began in which goods could be delivered by designated agents. Conductors wore khaki with a white topi, and inspectors wore khaki. Conductors had machines to issue tickets. Later buses were manufactured by Dodge, Fargo, Bedford, and Chevrolet.

The TSTD operated on three routes: Trivandrum-Nagercoil, Nagercoil-Kanyakumari, and Nagercoil-Colachal. Regular service began on 21 February 1938 with 39 buses. The minimum fare for one mile was one-half chakram The next fare was one chakram, and first-class tickets were 50 percent more. Children under age three travelled free, and those between three and 14 paid half the fare.

The Motor Vehicle Act was passed in 1939. Bus service was extended to Cochin in 1949, and to the Malabar region in 1956.

Kerala State Road Transport Corporation 

The Kerala State Road Transport Corporation (KSRTC) was established by the Kerala government on 15 March 1965 after the Road Transport Corporation Act, which came into force in 1950. The Transport Department became an autonomous corporation on 1 April 1965.

At the time, there were 661 bus routes and 36 lorry routes. The corporation's fleet consisted of 901 buses, 51 lorries, and 29 other vehicles; thirty buses and eight lorries were new. Ten old buses, seven lorries, and one tractor-trailer were converted to other uses. The KLX registration series was reserved for the KSRTC. On 1 July 1989, KSRTC buses began registration at a dedicated RTO in Trivandrum with the KL-15 registration series.

In 2001 K. B. Ganesh Kumar became transport minister, and his brief tenure brought beneficial changes to the corporation. KSRTC was the first state to introduce Volvo buses into its fleet. Body work was outsourced, and the buses' contemporary design was publicized as high-tech. Kumar commissioned Sabu Cyril to redesign the bus livery. Low-entry, air suspension buses were introduced in Trivandrum, and minibus service began. The changes attracted passengers, making the corporation profitable.

The Kerala government issued a notification in 2012 suspending new permits for inter-district buses, exempting the KSRTC. Although it was assumed that the corporation would assume those routes, it created a shortage of service from Kochi to several northern districts. CPPR research and projects director Madhu Sivaraman conducted a study of KSRTC-private bus options.

The Kerala Urban Road Transport Corporation (KURTC) was formed under KSRTC in 2015 to manage affairs related to urban transportation. It was inaugurated on 12 April 2015 at Thevara.

On 2 June 2021, the rights to use the acronym KSRTC, logo and the name 'AanaVandi' were fully given to Kerala State Road Transport Corporation according to the trademarks act 1999, after a seven-year battle with the Karnataka State Road Transport Corporation, who issued a notice in 2014, stating that Kerala should stop using KSRTC. After the long drawn-out battle over intellectual property rights, the Kerala Road Transport Corporation has got the legal right to its trademarks acronym 'KSRTC' associated with the state-run transport corporation. Trade Marks registry certified that the emblem, the abbreviation KSRTC, logo and the name Aanavandi shall belong to Kerala Road Transport corporation. Kerala's claim was approved on 3 June 2021 by the Controller General of Patents Design and Trade Marks under the Ministry of Commerce and Industry. The registration made Kerala RTC the lone custodian of the trademarks.

On 21 June 2021, KSRTC launched its first LNG bus service from Thiruvananthapuram to Ernakulam for regular passengers. The first commercial LNG bus service had been launched exclusively for Petronet employees in Kochi earlier.

On 9 November 2021, KSRTC-SWIFT was formed as an independent company to operate the long-distance buses of KSRTC efficiently for a period of 10 years.

Fleet

The corporation has a fleet of 6241 buses consisting Volvo, Scania, Ashok Leyland, Tata Motors, Eicher Motors and minibuses. The vehicles owned by KSRTC is registered under a dedicated RTO at Thiruvananthapuram with a registration series KL-15.

Fleet numbering system 
Although KSRTC has a dedicated RTO (Regional Transport Officer) to register its fleet, all its buses have bonnet numbers (for internal identification) adjacent to the depot mark at the front of the vehicle. RPE981, a typical fleet number, can be split into three parts: RP, E and 981. RP indicates the vehicle series, derived from the word transport; each series contains 1,000 vehicles. During the 1960s, KSRTC began assigning the serial number T  to its buses; R followed the first 1,000 buses, followed by A and so on until the P series. Repetitive letters and the letter O were exempted. Later, two-letter combinations were used to identify bus series. The 1,000th bus in each series is numbered with a multiple of 1,000, indicating the total number of buses introduced by the corporation.

The second part (E in the example) denotes the KSRTC workshop where the body work was done, and is absent on buses purchased fully built and outsourced bodywork. KSRTC owns five workshops: one central and four regional:

The third part is the vehicle number of the series. In addition to this system, a TE was assigned to 144 buses built in Edappal from 1997 to 2003. Their depot vehicles are numbered in a D series, and the oil tankers are numbered in a TT series. The corporation has several ambulances, numbered AV. Buses procured as part of the Jawaharlal Nehru National Urban Renewal Mission are numbered JN.

Services

KSRTC launched its first LNG bus service on 21 June 2021 in order to reduce the operational losses and to promote an energy source considered to be far less damaging to the environment. The bus service would be operated on the Thiruvananthapuram-Ernakulam and Ernakulam-Kozhikode routes.
Gajaraj

Introduced in 2022, KSRTC Swift operates Volvo AC sleeper buses on long distance / interstate routes.

Discontinued services

Subsidiaries

Kerala Urban Road Transport Corporation
In November 2014, Kerala Urban Road Transport Corporation (KURTC) was formed to operate low-floor buses procured with financial assistance from the Jawaharlal Nehru National Urban Renewal Mission (JNNURM).

KSRTC SWIFT
KSRTC SWIFT (K-SWIFT) is a company formed on 9 November 2021 by KSRTC with an aim to overcome the financial crisis faced by the corporation. K-SWIFT function independently within the KSRTC and operates the long-distance buses of the corporation.

Zones

There were 5 KSRTC zones until 2018: Thiruvananthapuram, Kollam, Ernakulam, Thrissur and Kozhikode. But it has been reduced to three in 2018.

The Thiruvananthapuram (south) zone, which includes three districts, has more buses. The north zone (which includes six districts) has 945 buses, most long-distance.

Depots and workshops
KSRTC has 28 depots, 45 sub-depots, 19 operating centres, 28 stationmaster offices, five workshops and three staff-training colleges throughout the state. In 1995, the corporation established the Sree Chitra Thirunal College of Engineering in Pappanamcode at its central workshop.

KSRTC has 28 station master (SM) offices in Ambalapuzha, Ayoor, Eenchakkal, Ernakulam Jetty, Ettumanoor, Iritty, Kadakkal, Kaliyakkavila, Kuthiyathode, Malayilkeezh, Mundakkayam, Nagarcoil, Ochira, Pattambi, Pothencode, Puthenkurishu, Tirur, Valanchery, Varkala, Vytila Hub, and staff-training colleges in Trivandrum, Ernakulam and Edappal.

Fares

KSRTC uses a fare-stage system to calculate fares.

24 Hour Passenger support system is available and the Contact number for the same is 0471 - 2463799 or 9447071021. 
Passengers can also submit the suggestions and complaints through the official face book page of KSRTC

Cultural impact and in media
KSRTC buses have a wide fan following across the entire state of Kerala. Fondly called as Aanavandi, it has close to 100 dedicated fan pages on Instagram. Many people see KSRTC buses as a callback to their childhood nostalgia, while some others enjoys frequently travelling in these buses. Even some incidents have been reported where the passengers request the authority to bring their favourite buses, which was taken to other depots from their existing depots.

KSRTC buses have been featured in many Malayalam movies. The 2012 film Ordinary's main plot is revolving around some incidents happening in a KSRTC bus. Since then, film fraternity started associating KSRTC buses to the culture of Keralites. There is a famous quote from the movie Jacobinte Swargarajyam about KSRTC buses where the hero states that "one Malayali (Keralite) has to travel in a KSRTC bus to be qualified  as a Malayali". The 2021 movie Yuvam is completely based on KSRTC. It shows the journey of three young advocates, who tries to  save KSRTC from getting privatised due to debts which happened due the inlawful actions by some politicians.

"The history of KSRTC in Kerala is intertwined with the lives of the people. It's not just a vehicle service. This public transport system has left its mark on our cultural life, including in cinema and literature and it cannot be erased so quickly"; said Antony Raju following the legal battle Kerala won over Karnataka to use the brand KSRTC. Kerala has won the trademark battle against Karnataka. The acronym KSRTC, which was being used by the Kerala State Road Transport Corporation and the Karnataka State Road Transport Corporation, will now be used only in Kerala.

See also
 Kerala Urban Road Transport Corporation
 KSRTC SWIFT

External links 

KSRTC Official Website
http://www.online.keralartc.com/
https://www.facebook.com/KeralaStateRoadTransportCorporation/

References 

 

Bus companies of India
Transport in Kerala
State road transport corporations of India
State agencies of Kerala
Companies based in Thiruvananthapuram
Transport companies established in 1938
Indian companies established in 1938